Dulhan is a 1974 Indian Hindi-language drama film, produced by B. Anand Valli under the Sujatha International banner and directed by C. V. Rajendran. It stars Jeetendra, Hema Malini, Jamuna  and music composed by Laxmikant Pyarelal. The film is a remake of 1972 Kannada movie Yaava Janmada Maitri  which was earlier remade in Telugu as Sarada (1973) and in Tamil as Radha (1973).

Plot
Dr. Ashok (Jeetendra) is a renowned psychiatrist who lives with his wife Padma (Jamuna). Once, he visits a village where everyone is dumbfounded and Radha (Hema Malini) one eagerly waiting for her husband, indulges to see him. At that point, he learns about the past from her brother Keshav (Ashok Kumar). Radha is the darling daughter of the village as she concerns and facilitates everyone. Dr. Vijay (again Jeetendra), a person who resembles Ashok, is a man with fine ideologies who establishes a hospital in the village. He falls for Radha and they couple up. Soon after, a tragedy Vijay dies by capsizing in the river, and in that shock, Radha loses her memory. Hence, to save her the entire village hides the reality from her. Listening to it, Ashok determines to make Radha normal in the imaginary form of her husband and brings her to the city. Knowing it, Padma berates initially but later realizes virtue of her husband and condition of Radha, she too cooperates. After some time, Radha suspects the relationship between Ashok and Padma, which leads to several misunderstandings. At last, the truth comes before Radha but she faces it courageously and gets back. Finally, the movie ends with Radha leaving her breath before her husband's grave.

Cast
Jeetendra as Ashok and Vijay (dual role)
Hema Malini as Radha
Jamuna as Padma
Ashok Kumar as Keshav 
Nazir Hussain as Munsib
Mehmood as Raju
Paintal
Agha as Mamuji
Manorama as Mamiji

Soundtrack

References

External links 
 

1975 films
1970s Hindi-language films
Films scored by Laxmikant–Pyarelal
Hindi remakes of Kannada films
Films directed by C. V. Rajendran